Master of the Figdor Deposition (1480–1500), was an Early Netherlandish painter.

Biography
He was named by Max J. Friedlander after the Austrian banker and art collector Albert Figdor for an altarpiece painting he owned and which was displayed in the Gemäldegalerie, Berlin, but which was destroyed in 1945 during World War II.	This artist is sometimes also called the Master of the Martyrdom of St. Lucy after the backside of the destroyed altarpiece, which is in the collection of the Rijksmuseum Amsterdam. On stylistic grounds the painter has been called "Pseudo-Geertgen" or the pupil of Geertgen tot Sint Jans and was probably active in Haarlem.	

For the similarity of the alternate name, this artist is sometimes confused with the Flemish Master of the Legend of Saint Lucy.

References
	
Master of the Figdor Deposition on Artnet	
	
	
	
	
	

1480 births
1500 deaths
Early Netherlandish painters
Painters from Haarlem